Daniel Rodighiero (born 20 September 1940) is a French former professional footballer who played as a striker.

References

External links
 
 
 Profile at FFF 
 Profile at tangofoot.free.fr 

1940 births
Living people
Sportspeople from Saint-Cloud
French footballers
Footballers from Hauts-de-Seine
Association football forwards
France international footballers
Red Star F.C. players
Stade Malherbe Caen players
Stade Rennais F.C. players
Valenciennes FC players
Stade Lavallois players
Ligue 1 players